Christie Lee Woods (born October 21, 1977) is an American model and actress who, in 1996, was the first Texan to capture the Miss Teen USA crown.

Woods first came to prominence as a beauty queen, winning the titles of Miss Texas Teen USA and Miss Teen USA 1996. She later appeared as an actress and as a participant on reality television show, The Amazing Race.

Pageants

Miss Teen USA 1996
Woods won the Miss Houston Teen USA title in 1995, then competed in Miss Texas Teen USA 1996, winning the title.  She represented Texas in the 1996 Miss Teen USA pageant broadcast live from Las Cruces, New Mexico in August 1996, and became the first woman from her state to win the Miss Teen USA title.

As Miss Teen USA, her sister titleholders were, Alicia Machado, Miss Universe 1996, of Venezuela, and Ali Landry, Miss USA 1996, of Louisiana.

She also reigned alongside Brook Lee, who briefly held the title of Miss USA 1997 before winning the 1997 Miss Universe pageant; and Miss Teen USA 1989 and 1st runner-up to Miss USA 1997, Brandi Sherwood, who succeeded Lee as Miss USA.

During her reign,  Woods traveled extensively throughout the United States and made appearances for charity, giving up her title in August 1997, when she crowned Shelly Moore of Tennessee as Miss Teen USA 1997 in her home state, Texas.

Miss Texas USA 2002
In 2001, Woods returned to pageantry and competed in the Miss Texas USA 2002 pageant as Miss Central Texas.  She was one of six former Miss Texas Teen USA titleholders to participate in the event.  Woods won the swimsuit, interview, and Miss Photogenic awards, but only placed third runner-up. This was the first time that a former Miss Teen USA titleholder did not win a Miss USA state pageant on their first try. Woods' successor to the Miss Texas Teen USA title, Andria Mullins, also lost and placed second runner-up to eventual winner, Miss Dallas Fort Worth, Kasi Kelly, who was not even a former Miss Texas Teen USA.

Miss Texas USA 2003
The following year, Woods tried and won the Miss Houston USA title, gaining the right to compete at Miss Texas USA 2003 and once again failed to win the crown, only placing as one of the semifinalists alongside Mullins, who also competed, but was not crowned either. This time Woods' predecessor to the Miss Texas Teen USA crown, Mandy Jeffreys, matched Woods' 2002 placement as third runner-up, only to lose to Nicole O'Brian, Miss Texas Teen USA 2000, who could not capture the Miss Teen USA 2000 or Miss USA 2003 crowns.

Miss Texas USA 2004
Woods competed for the third time in Miss Texas USA 2004, and again only placed in the semifinals. This was her last attempt at the title, because of age restrictions imposed on contestants.

Woods would represent the changing times, where  none of the former Miss Teen USA titleholders would win a Miss USA state crown. Jamie Solinger of Iowa (3rd runner-up to Mrs. America 2005) and Shauna Gambill of California (first runner-up to Miss USA 1998 and Top 10 at Miss World 1998) would be the last in 1998.

Television

Acting
Woods played Rowena in the TV series The New Adventures of Robin Hood in the late 1990s.  She also had guest appearances on Malibu, CA (1998) and USA High (1998).

The Amazing Race

The Amazing Race 5

In January 2004, Woods competed on the fifth season of the CBS adventure reality show The Amazing Race with her boyfriend, Colin Guinn. The two reached the final leg of the race, but lost the final leg to fellow racers, married parents Chip and Kim McAllister.

The Amazing Race 5 finishes

An  placement with a double-dagger indicates that Colin and Christie were the last to arrive at a pit stop in a non-elimination leg.
A  indicates that Colin and Christie won the Fast Forward.
A  indicates that Colin and Christie were on the receiving end of a Yield.

Roadblocks performed by Woods are bolded

The Amazing Race 11
Woods and Guinn were also expecting to be in the All-Star edition of the show; however, Woods was expecting the couple's first child and therefore could not participate.

The Amazing Race 31
In 2019, Woods and Guinn competed on and won The Amazing Race 31.

References

External links

CBS cast profile

1977 births
American television actresses
Living people
Miss Teen USA winners
1996 beauty pageant contestants
20th-century Miss Teen USA delegates
The Amazing Race (American TV series) contestants
People from Huntsville, Texas
Reality show winners